The pandero jarocho, pandero octagonal or pandero tlacotalpeño is a kind of tambourine typical of  the Mexican state of Veracruz. It is octagonal in shape, ringed with eight jangling metal disks, and with an animal skin stretched over one side. The most common methods of playing are two: one, by alternately tapping the skin with the thumb and forefinger, jangling the disks and creating a dull beat on the skin; two, by running the outstretched thumb over the skin near the perimeter of the frame.

References 

 
 
 

Mexican musical instruments
Membranophones